Singhik is a town in Mangan subdivision, North Sikkim district of the Indian state of Sikkim, four kilometres from Mangan, the district headquarters.

Location
Singhik is about 70 km from the state capital, Gangtok, linked by a national highway passing the headquarters of North Sikkim District, Mangan, which is 4 km from the village.

People
The people of Singhik represent three ethnic communities:  the Lepcha, Nepali, and Bhutia.  Lepcha comprise nearly 80% of the population.

Geography
It has an average elevation of 1,560 metres (5,118 feet).

References

Cities and towns in Mangan district